Christdala Evangelical Swedish Lutheran Church (Den Svenska Evangeliska Lutherska Christdala Församlingen) is a historic church located in Forest Township, Rice County, Minnesota.

The church was listed on the National Register of Historic Places by the United States Department of the Interior in 1995 because of its historical significance and its ties to the Northfield, Minnesota bank robbery by the James-Younger Gang on September 7, 1876.

Early Swedish Settlers
Christdala congregation was formed in 1877 by Swedish immigrants who settled in Rice County. The church was built in Late Gothic Revival style during 1878. Worship services were discontinued in 1966. Dating from 1994, several members of the former Christdala congregation formed the Christdala Church Preservation and Cemetery. Christdala Church and Cemetery are both well preserved. Today the church serves as a memorial to the contributions made by a small group of Swedish-American settlers in Rice County in the latter half of the 19th century.  They prospered, built a simple church and made lasting contributions to their community.

Chronology
1856 – George Miller homesteaded  and platted a village recorded as "Millersburg." Miller erected a mill and a hotel and a partner started a general store, attracting "Yankee" settlers from the east. Later a post office and blacksmith shop were established.

1870 – First Swedish immigrants settled in the Millersburg area from the Red Wing–Vasa area and initially held services in their homes.

1871 – Lester post office established by John W. Thompson one mile (1.6 km) west of Christdala. Thompson's business card read: Notary Public, Justice of the Peace, Real Estate Developer, Minnesota State Legislature, Postmaster." More than half a dozen Swedish families now lived in the vicinity.

1873 – Economic depression in the U.S.

1876 – Nicolaus Gustafson, a recent immigrant from Sweden, was killed in Northfield, Minnesota on September 7, 1876 during the notorious James-Younger Gang's robbery of the Northfield bank on September 7. Gustafson was buried in the Northfield Cemetery because the Millersburg Swedish community had no church or cemetery. The Millersburg Swedes immediately started planning for the construction of their own church and cemetery. The old church records lead to a conclusion that Jesse James was not in Minnesota during the Northfield bank robbery but remained with his family in Nashville, Tennessee. It appears that the gang leaders at the time of the Northfield robbery were Cole Younger and Frank James.

1877 – The first Swedish immigrants to settle in the dense and virgin "Big Woods" of Rice County formed the Christdala congregation on July 18, 1877. Christdala was admitted into the Minnesota Conference of the Lutheran Augustana Synod.

1878 – Christdala church building was constructed by John Olson and John Lundberg of Northfield for $230.00. The existing Christdala Church building is original and has never been altered or moved.

1878 to 1918 – High point of Swedish immigration into the U.S., Minnesota & Rice County.

1880 – Pulpit was built by John Olson for $15.00, interior walls plastered, native ash wainscoting installed. Oil lamps and first organ acquired. Annual membership dues were $4.00 for men, $3.00 for women and the church building had an insured value of $600.00.

1881 – Front steps and horse stalls were built; table, chairs, baptismal font purchased (still in church today). Each family required to provide one cord of basswood per year for heating.

1882 – Christdala congregation reached 70 families and Sunday church attendance averaged 170 people.

1885 – Christdala church constitution adopted. Over 55% of Christdala's budget was dedicated to education. The church records stated: "The fruit of a surrendered life becomes capable of sacrificing personal advantages for the sake and welfare of the group."

1886 – New organ purchased from Wick Organ Company in Chicago (still in use today).

1890 – Membership peaked at 230 members. Church resolution: "Resolved that all children know their ABCs before they attend school."

1892 – Carpet installed inside church. Treasurer's report: "All debts have been paid and there is a balance of $147.14 in the treasury. This is the best condition in all of our history."

1893 – Window shades & burial equipment acquired. Economic depression in U.S. ("Cleveland's Panic").

1895 –  bell tower added to front of church.

1897 – Congregation acquired Blacksmith Sandbo's house west of Millersburg for $552.99 as a parish house.

1901 – Bell installed in belfry.

1903 – English services offered once a month on Sunday afternoon or evening.

1917 - English adopted as the only language. New wood-burning furnace and hot air registers installed, wood fireplace in basement removed, convection floor slats covered. Original hand-fashioned kneeling benches replaced with 18 identical oak pews, 9 on each side of the center aisle.

1927 – Christdala celebrated 50th Anniversary.

1938 – Fewer than six pioneer families remained in the Christdala community.

1942 – Christdala's 65th Anniversary: "The blessings of their endeavors are ours.…as giants in the earth they stood, their faith in God availing."

1950 – Church membership declined to 30 members.

1957 – Interior walls replastered and painted for Christdala's 80th Anniversary.

1966 – Membership declined to a handful, Christdala congregation disestablished.

1978 – Christdala cemetery association established.

1994 – Christdala Church Preservation & Cemetery Association incorporated as an IRS-approved charitable organization for tax-deductible gifts. Substantial funds raised to preserve the church with new paint, roof, windows, fence, front steps, flag poles.

1995 - Christdala formally placed on "The National Register of Historic Places" by U.S. Department of the Interior (National Park Service) because of historical significance. Lt. Governor Joanne Benson officiated at official induction ceremony at Christdala. The History of the Christdala Evangelical Lutheran Church prepared, copies available upon request.

2002 – Christdala celebrated 125th Anniversary. Christdala Preservation Association established a Permanent Fund goal of $1,000,000 for perpetual maintenance.

2007 - Christdala celebrated 130th Anniversary; invested over $250,000 in the church and cemetery between 1994-2007.

2008 - Christdala acquired the old Millersburg Schoolhouse, built in 1887, for use as a records repository and community museum. Restoration of the old one-room schoolhouse where the local Swedish community attended school into the 1950s is on-going.

References

Related reading
Quist, B. Wayne   (1996) The History of the Christdala Evangelical Lutheran Church  (Dundas, Minnesota: Small World Press)

External links
  Christdala Lutheran Church website

Churches on the National Register of Historic Places in Minnesota
Lutheran churches in Minnesota
Churches completed in 1878
19th-century Lutheran churches in the United States
19th-century Lutheran churches
Churches in Rice County, Minnesota
Swedish-American culture in Minnesota
National Register of Historic Places in Rice County, Minnesota